Arakkonam (also known as Arkonam) is a state assembly constituency in the Indian state of Tamil Nadu. Its State Assembly Constituency number is 38. It includes the city of Arakkonam in Ranipettai district and is reserved for candidates from the Scheduled Castes. It is part of the Arakkonam constituency for national elections to the Parliament of India. It is one of the 234 State Legislative Assembly Constituencies in Tamil Nadu in India.

Madras State

Tamil Nadu

Election results

2021

2016

2011

2006

2001

1996

1991

1989

1984

1980

1977

1971

1967

1962

1957

1952

References 

 

Assembly constituencies of Tamil Nadu
Vellore district